SS Barney Kirschbaum was a Liberty ship built in the United States during World War II. She was named after Barney Kirschbaum, the master of the American merchant ship .

Construction
Barney Kirschbaum was laid down on 15 February 1945, under a Maritime Commission (MARCOM) contract, MC hull 2348, by J.A. Jones Construction, Panama City, Florida; she was launched on 30 March 1945.

History
She was allocated to Weyerhaeuser Steamship Company, on 21 March 1945. On 14 June 1949, she was laid up in the National Defense Reserve Fleet, Hudson River Reserve Fleet, Jones Point, New York. On 17 August 1953, she was placed in the National Defense Reserve Fleet, Mobile, Alabama. She was sold for scrapping, 9 June 1972, to Pinto Island Metals Co., for $32,500. She was withdrawn from the fleet, 13 February 1973.

References

Bibliography

 
 
 
 

 

Liberty ships
Ships built in Panama City, Florida
1945 ships
Hudson River Reserve Fleet
Mobile Reserve Fleet